County of Dalhousie  may refer to:
 County of Dalhousie (South Australia)
 County of Dalhousie, Victoria

See also
 Dalhousie (disambiguation)